Jean-Baptiste de Lavalette or Louis Jean-Baptiste de Lavalette or Louis Jean-Baptiste de Thomas de la Valette, Count of la Valette, was a former noble turned Robespierrist.

He was elected lieutenant colonel commanding the Lombards battalion in September 1792. He served as commanding officer, leader of popular society, military governor, and lieutenant colonel.

He was guillotined the 10 Thermidor Year II (28 July 1794) in the wake of Thermidorian Reaction, as a Hanriot assistant and a Robespierrist,

Early life
Jean-Baptiste de Lavalette was born in Paris the 27 October 1753 from Joseph François de Thomas de la Valette (1729-1765) and Marie d'Alencé.
He has two brothers and one sister: 
François Louis Clair de Thomas de la Valette (1750-1836), emigrated in 1789;
François Joseph Elisabeth de Thomas de la Valette, guillotined in 1794;
Marie Louise de Thomas de la Valette, emigrated with her family.

Garde de la Marine in 1769, Jean-Baptiste de Lavalette was the 1 June 1772 a second lieutenant in the 7th Cuirassier Regiment called then Royal-Etranger Cavalry Regiment.
He gave up his army career in 1774 and married Henriette Élisabeth von Thurn und Taxis in Saint-Max the 12 Novembre 1778 and had three children.

French Revolutionary Wars
Firstly commanding officer of the National Guard in Nancy, he settled in Paris in September 1790. He was required by the municipality to gather volunteers for the revolutionary Lombards section in Paris. He became commandant of the Oratoire Battalion then of an armed section of the Gardes Françaises the 12 August 1792.

In September 1792, he was elected lieutenant colonel commanding the Lombards battalion, took part in the Argonne campaign then followed Durnouriez in Belgium.

Temporary commandant in Brussels during the French occupation, he was one of the leaders of the popular society. When the Belgian Primary Assemblies were convened concerning the decision to attach Belgium to France, he went to Ghent the 22 February 1793 to assist the Commissioner Courtois. As a result of their action, 2,000 Ghent citizens wished to attach Belgium to France.

He was assigned in Lille by Blaise Duval the 31 March 1793, appointed National Commissioner in Cambrai the 18 April to rally and retrain the troops from Belgium, then appointed temporary commandant of Cambrai by Dampierre in place of Claude Aubert (fr).

The 25 April 1793, he was appointed military governor of Lille. Promoted brigadier general in the Army of the Coasts of Brest on 15 May 1793, the Executive Council (fr) ordered him to stay in Lille to assist Favart (fr) in "operations having defence implications for this town by an officer who was already familiar with it, as a civic, energetic and militarily well-qualified partner".

Dismissed for a first time by Duhem and Lesage-Senault because of a dispute with the general Lamarlière, he was imprisoned for indiscipline. But Robespierre himself took the Lavalette case to the National Convention and the general was freed of the charges the 24 July.

Reinstated the 3 August, he reorganized the revolutionary army in Lille headed by Dufresse (fr). But the 9 December 1793, Bourdon de l'Oise criticized him before the National Convention for marrying a German emigrated princess and for denouncing patriots.

The two representatives on mission Hentz et Florent-Guiot (fr) wound up his army and placed Lavalette under provisional arrest. Then, on 18 December 1793, on request of Duhem, the Convention adopted a decree which ordered that he had to be transferred to Paris.

Thanks to Robespierre, on 23 Floréal (12 May 1794), the Committee of Public Safety adopted a decree which ordered his release and his reinstatement.

Lavalette asked to serve under Hanriot as a commander of a battalion of the French National Guard and joined the 17th division the 24 May 1794.

Notes

References

1753 births
1794 deaths
French people executed by guillotine during the French Revolution
French Revolution
French generals